Ballads of the Hills and Plains is the fourth studio album by American musician Hank Williams Jr. The album was issued by MGM Records as number E/SE 4316.

Track listing

Side one
 "The River" (Cliff Friend, Jack Sanders, Mack Vickery) – 2:53
 "Doc Holiday" (John Paulovic) – 2:09
 "Cowpoke" (Stan Jones) – 2:06
 "Blood's Thicker Than Water" (Danny Dill, Wayne P. Walker) – 2:32
 "The Blizzard" (Harlan Howard) – 3:24
 "Stampede" (Jim Dale, Frances Paulin) – 2:40

Side two
 "The Rainmaker" (Cliff Friend, Jack Sanders, Mack Vickery) – 2:34
 "Streets of Laredo" (Traditional) – 4:04
 "Black Lightning" (Ricky Hester) – 2:56
 "Big Twenty" (Dillis) – 2:00
 "The Eyes of Death" (Danny Dill) – 2:42
 "I'm Afraid" (Allen Nelson, Carolyn Stringer) – 2:17

Personnel 
 Hank Williams Jr. – guitar, vocals

Hank Williams Jr. and the Cheatin' Hearts

Grady Martin, Jerry Kennedy, Harold Bradley, Ray Edenton – guitar
Bob Moore – bass
Hargus "Pig" Robbins – piano
The Jordanaires – vocal accompaniment

References

External links
 Hank Williams Jr's Official Website

1965 albums
Hank Williams Jr. albums
MGM Records albums